Anders Hasselgård (born 1 February 1978) is a Norwegian former footballer who played as a midfielder for Molde in Tippeligaen. He later became a political scientist.

Career
Hasselgård was born in Molde and played as a midfielder for Molde FK, where he spent most of his career. He made his debut in Tippeligaen in 1995, and played his last match in 2004. In total he played 112 games in Tippeligaen, scoring 12 goals. He also played for Lisleby, Eidsvåg and Lørenskog.

Hasselgård represented Norway at youth level, and was played three games and scored one goal for the under-18 team in 1996, before he was capped four times, scoring one goal, for the under-21 team in 1998 and 1999.

He later enrolled at the University of Oslo. Writing his master's degree, he was hired as a research fellow at the Norwegian Institute of International Affairs.

References

External links 
 
 

1978 births
Living people
People from Molde
Norwegian footballers
Norway under-21 international footballers
Norway youth international footballers
Molde FK players
Lisleby FK players
Lørenskog IF players
Eliteserien players
University of Oslo alumni
Norwegian political scientists
Association football midfielders
Sportspeople from Møre og Romsdal